Randa Ghazy (born 21/12/1986 in Saronno) is an Italian writer of Egyptian origins.

Biography
Ghazy was born in Italy on the 21/12/1986 to Egyptian parents and studied International Relations at the University of Milan. In 2002 at the age of 15 she wrote her first novel “Sognando Palestina” (Dreaming of Palestine), which has been translated in 16 languages. The book had its share of controversy and criticism. Ghazy wrote the book based on news reports and her own research. The book told the story of a group of young Palestinians who have a tough life in the Israel-occupied region of the West Bank and Gaza. The protagonists of the story are oppressed by the Israelis. This portrayal drew angry criticism from Jewish critics who thought the book incited hatred against the Jews, prompting extremist acts like suicide bombings against Israeli targets. There were calls in France to ban the book.

Bibliography

References

21st-century Italian women writers
Egyptian writers
Living people
Italian people of Egyptian descent
University of Milan alumni
People from Saronno
1986 births
21st-century Egyptian women writers
21st-century Egyptian writers